Oncidium lentiginosum is a species of orchid occurring from Colombia to northern Venezuela.

lentiginosum